Sir Richard Kingsland,  (19 October 1916 – 27 August 2012) was an Australian RAAF pilot known for being the youngest Australian group captain at age 29. He later became a senior public servant, heading the Departments of the Interior, Repatriation, and Veterans' Affairs.

Biography
Julius Allan Cohen was born in 1916.  He later changed his name to Richard Kingsland, to avoid anti-semitism.

Kingsland was sent to Morocco in 1940 to rescue two of Britain's most senior WWII leaders, Duff Cooper and John Vereker, 6th Viscount Gort. Kingsland managed to rescue them from French headquarters with only two other men and managed to flee in a Seaplane. That same year, he and his crew were sent to bomb a major Japanese headquarters established in Rabaul, New Guinea.

For his invaluable service, he was awarded the Distinguished Flying Cross (DFC) in September 1940.

In June 2010, he published his autobiography, Into the Midst of Things.

Public service
During his public service career, rising to become Secretary of the Departments of Interior, Repatriation, and Veterans' Affairs, Kingsland served 12 ministers and built a reputation as a trusted and experienced departmental head.

Awards and honours
Richard Kingsland was appointed a Commander of the Order of the British Empire (CBE) in 1967. He was knighted in 1978, and appointed an Officer of the Order of Australia in 1989.

In 2013, a street in the Canberra suburb of Casey was named Kingsland Parade in Richard Kingsland's honour.

Death
Richard Kingsland died in August 2012, aged 95.  He was survived by his wife of 68 years, Kathleen Kingsland, two daughters and a son.

References

1916 births
2012 deaths
Australian aviators
Australian Commanders of the Order of the British Empire
Australian Jews
Australian Knights Bachelor
Australian public servants
Australian World War II pilots
Commanders of the Order of the British Empire
Officers of the Order of Australia
Recipients of the Distinguished Flying Cross (United Kingdom)
Royal Australian Air Force officers
Royal Australian Air Force personnel of World War II
Secretaries of the Australian Government Veterans' Affairs Department